Myosin light chain 6B is a protein that in humans is encoded by the MYL6B gene. Myosin is a hexameric ATPase cellular motor protein. It is composed of two heavy chains, two nonphosphorylatable alkali light chains, and two phosphorylatable regulatory light chains. This gene encodes a myosin alkali light chain expressed in both slow-twitch skeletal muscle and in nonmuscle tissue.

References

Further reading

External links 
 

EF-hand-containing proteins